is a Japanese professional footballer who plays as a midfielder for Mito HollyHock.

Career statistics

References

External links

1998 births
Living people
Miyazaki Sangyo-keiei University alumni
Association football people from Miyazaki Prefecture
Japanese footballers
Association football midfielders
J3 League players
Fukushima United FC players
Tegevajaro Miyazaki players